Düsseldorf-Derendorf is a railway station situated at Derendorf, Düsseldorf in western Germany. It is served by Rhine-Ruhr S-Bahn lines S1 (every 30 minutes during the day), S6 (every 20 minutes) and S11 (every 20 minutes). It is also served by Tram line 701 and various bus lines, all operated by the Rheinbahn.

References

Railway stations in Düsseldorf
Rhine-Ruhr S-Bahn stations
S1 (Rhine-Ruhr S-Bahn)
S6 (Rhine-Ruhr S-Bahn)
S11 (Rhine-Ruhr S-Bahn)